Robert Dante Siboldi Badiola (born 24 September 1965) is a Uruguayan professional manager and former footballer. During his playing career, he played as a goalkeeper and was nicknamed "Flaco."

Playing career

Club career
Siboldi played professional club football in Uruguay, Argentina, Mexico, and Colombia.

In Mexico, he played for Atlas, Cruz Azul, Puebla, and UANL Tigres.

He came to Tigres in 1995, a season in which the team was relegated to Primera División A. Siboldi chose to stay, and was instrumental in returning the team to First Division within the year. He became an icon of the city of Monterrey, and played for Tigres until 1999.

International career
Siboldi made his international debut on June 21, 1992, in a friendly against Australia (2-0). He obtained a total number of 34 international caps for the Uruguay national football team.

Managerial career
He was announced on May 4, 2009, as the new Cruz Azul coach, replacing Benjamin Galindo.

On August 8, 2018, Santos Laguna announced they had accepted Siboldi's resignation after a conflict with a player.

On April 19, 2021, Club Tijuana announced that Siboldi would take over the club after former coach Pablo Guede resigned following a 3-2 loss against Mazatlan FC.

On September 29, 2021, Club Tijuana announced that Siboldi would no longer be the coach for Club Tijuana leaving the club after 5 months in charge following a 3-0 loss against Club Necaxa the day before.

On 5 March 2022, Siboldi was appointed as the manager of Saudi Arabian club Al-Ahli. He was sacked on 4 September 2022. He got the club relegated to the First Division for the first time in its history.

Honours

Player
Peñarol
 Uruguayan Primera División: 1985, 1986
 Copa Libertadores: 1987

UANL
 Liga de Ascenso de México: Invierno 1996, Verano 1997
 Copa México: 1995–96

Individual
Mexican Primera División Golden Glove: 1989–90

Manager
Cruz Azul Jasso
 Segunda División de México: Clausura 2007

Santos Laguna
 Liga MX: Clausura 2018

Cruz Azul
 Leagues Cup: 2019

Individual
Liga MX Manager of the Tournament: 2017–18

References

External links
 Robert Siboldi at Official Liga MX Profile 
 Robert Siboldi at Soccerway
 Profile at Tenfield 
 Argentine Primera Statistics at Fútbol XXI 

1965 births
Club Puebla players
Living people
Uruguayan footballers
Uruguayan expatriate footballers
Association football goalkeepers
Club de Gimnasia y Esgrima La Plata footballers
Argentinos Juniors footballers
Expatriate footballers in Argentina
Atlas F.C. footballers
Cruz Azul footballers
Cruz Azul managers
Tigres UANL footballers
Atlético Junior footballers
Uruguayan Primera División players
Argentine Primera División players
Liga MX players
Categoría Primera A players
Uruguay international footballers
1993 Copa América players
1997 Copa América players
Uruguayan expatriate sportspeople in Argentina
Uruguayan expatriate sportspeople in Colombia
Uruguayan expatriate sportspeople in Mexico
Uruguayan expatriate sportspeople in Saudi Arabia
Expatriate footballers in Colombia
Expatriate footballers in Mexico
Expatriate football managers in Saudi Arabia
Uruguayan football managers
Liga MX managers
Saudi Professional League managers
Saudi First Division League managers
Al-Ahli Saudi FC managers